The Sound and the Silence is a 1992 television film directed by John Kent Harrison and starring John Bach as Alexander Graham Bell, Ian Bannen as Melville, Brenda Fricker as Eliza, and Jim McLarty as Sumner Tainter. The Sound and the Silence has a run time of 3 hours and 12 minutes and is a colorized film originally in the English language.

Plot
The film begins with Bell's childhood in Scotland, where his is initially intrigued by sights and sounds.  The film then follows his days as an inventor in Brantford, Ontario, Boston, Massachusetts, and Baddeck, Nova Scotia. The film was shot in New Zealand and on location at Alexander Graham Bell's Beinn Bhreagh estate in Baddeck, Nova Scotia, Canada.

Awards
The Sound and the Silence won the CableACE award in 1994 for International Movie or Miniseries/Comedy or Dramatic Special or Series. The film won Gemini Awards for Best Costume Design, Best Photography in a Dramatic Program or Series, and Best Production Design or Art Direction. The film was also nominated for Geminis in the categories of Best Direction in a Dramatic Program or Mini-Series, Best Dramatic Mini-Series, and Best Performance by an Actress in a Leading Role in a Dramatic Program or Mini-Series.

References

External links
 

1992 films
English-language Canadian films
Films shot in Nova Scotia
Canadian Screen Award-winning television shows
Irish television films
English-language Irish films
New Zealand television films
Canadian television films
Films set in the 19th century
Cultural depictions of Alexander Graham Bell
1990s English-language films
1990s Canadian films